Harnett County is a county located in the U.S. state of North Carolina. As of the 2020 census, the population was 133,568. Its county seat is Lillington; its largest city is Dunn. Harnett County is part of the Fayetteville metropolitan statistical area.

History
Harnett County was formed in 1855 from land given by Cumberland County. It was named for American Revolutionary war soldier Cornelius Harnett, who was also a delegate to the Continental Congress.  The first settlers came to the region in the mid-1720s, and were followed by Highland Scots immigrants.  The Scots settled in the foothills, where land was more affordable, rather than in the rich alluvial soil area of the coastal plain. After the defeat by the British of Bonny Prince Charles at Culloden, Scots immigrants came up the Cape Fear River in ever increasing numbers and settled in western Harnett County.  British immigrants had settled primarily along the banks of the Cape Fear River in the coastal area, generally from Erwin to Wilmington.

During the American Revolutionary War, many of the Scots were Loyalists. In their defeat in Scotland, they had been forced to take ironclad vows that prohibited taking up arms against the British. Some Rebels considered them traitors to the cause of Independence. Public executions of suspected spies occurred. One site near Lillington was the scene of a mass execution of "Scots traitors".

Though Harnett County was not a site of warfare during the Civil War, one of the last battles took place near Averasborough, which was once the third-most populated town in North Carolina, but is no longer in existence. During the Carolinas Campaign, the Left Wing of General William Sherman's army under the command of Maj. General Henry W. Slocum defeated the army of General William Hardee in the Battle of Averasborough and proceeded eastward. A centennial celebration of the event was held in 1965 at the site of the battlefield.

Geography

State and local protected areas/sites 
 Anderson Creek County Park
 Averasboro Battlefield and Museum
 Raven Rock State Park

Major water bodies 
 Black River
 Cape Fear River
 Little River (Cape Fear River tributary)
 Mingo Swamp (South River tributary)
 Neills Creek
 Upper Little River (Cape Fear River tributary)

Adjacent counties
 Wake County - north
 Johnston County - northeast
 Sampson County - southeast
 Cumberland County - south
 Moore County - west-southwest
 Lee County - west-northwest
 Chatham County - northwest

Major highways

 
  (Concurrency with US 421)

Major infrastructure 
 Fort Bragg (Linden Oaks)
 Harnett Regional Jetport

Demographics

2020 census

As of the 2020 United States census, 133,568 people, 46,416 households, and 31,025 families resided in the county.

2000 census
As of the census of 2000, there were 91,025 people, 33,800 households, and 24,099 families residing in the county.  The population density was 153 people per square mile (59/km2).  There were 38,605 housing units at an average density of 65 per square mile (25/km2).  The racial makeup of the county was 71.13% White, 22.50% Black or African American, 0.87% Native American, 0.65% Asian, 0.07% Pacific Islander, 3.21% from other races, and 1.57% from two or more races.  5.86% of the population were Hispanic or Latino of any race.

There were 33,800 households, out of which 36.00% had children under the age of 18 living with them, 53.20% were married couples living together, 13.50% had a female householder with no husband present, and 28.70% were non-families. 23.30% of all households were made up of individuals, and 8.50% had someone living alone who was 65 years of age or older.  The average household size was 2.61 and the average family size was 3.07.

In the county, the population was spread out, with 27.00% under the age of 18, 10.60% from 18 to 24, 32.10% from 25 to 44, 19.90% from 45 to 64, and 10.40% who were 65 years of age or older.  The median age was 32 years. For every 100 females there were 97.40 males.  For every 100 females age 18 and over, there were 95.00 males.

The median income for a household in the county was $35,105, and the median income for a family was $41,176. Males had a median income of $30,265 versus $22,283 for females. The per capita income for the county was $16,775.  About 11.30% of families and 14.90% of the population were below the poverty line, including 17.20% of those under age 18 and 19.40% of those age 65 or over.

Government and politics
Harnett is a typical "Solid South" county in its political history. Apart from the 1928 election when it defected to Herbert Hoover because of opposition to the Catholicism of Al Smith, Harnett voted rock-solid Democratic until the 1960s when opposition to increasing liberalism on racial policies turned the electorate toward the segregationist candidacy of George Wallace. Since then apart from when carried twice by native Southerner Jimmy Carter in 1976 and 1980, Harnett has been a solidly Republican county.

Harnett County is a member of the regional Mid-Carolina Council of Governments.

Education
Harnett County is home to Campbell University and to 27 other different schools: 4 primary schools, 13 elementary schools, 5 middle schools, 4 high schools, and 1 alternative school.

Harnett County Schools is the local public school district.

Schools in the county include:
 Primary: Anderson Creek, Gentry, Harnett, North Harnett
 Elementary: Angier, Benhaven, Boone Trail, Buies Creek, Coats, Erwin, Highland, Johnsonville, LaFayette, Lillington-Shawtown, Overhills, South Harnett, Wayne Avenue
 Middle: Coats-Erwin, Dunn, Harnett Central, Highland, Overhills, Western Harnett 
 High: Harnett Central, Overhills, Triton, Western Harnett
 Alternative: STAR Academy (grades 6–12)
 University: Campbell University

The Linden Oaks housing development, of Fort Bragg, has some Department of Defense Education Activity (DoDEA) schools, including Gary Ivan Gordon Elementary School, Randall David Shughart Elementary School, and Shugart Middle School. High school students living in Linden Oaks are assigned to Harnett County Schools' Overhills High School.

The county is served by the Harnett County Library System, based in Lillington with branches at Angier, Coats, Dunn, Erwin, Anderson Creek Primary School, and Boone Trail Community Center and Library.

Communities

City
 Dunn (largest city)

Towns
 Angier (most)
 Coats
 Erwin
 Lillington (county seat)
 Fuquay-Varina (small part)

Census-designated places
 Anderson Creek
 Buies Creek
 Bunnlevel
 Mamers
 Spout Springs

Townships

 Anderson Creek
 Averasboro
 Barbecue
 Black River
 Buckhorn
 Duke
 Grove
 Hectors Creek
 Johnsonville
 Lillington
 Neills Creek
 Stewarts Creek
 Upper Little River

Other unincorporated communities

 Barbecue
 Barclaysville
 Cape Fear
 Chalybeate Springs
 Christian Light
 Cokesbury
 Duncan
 Flat Branch
 Flatwoods
 Johnsonville
 Kipling
 Luart
 Olivia
 Overhills
 Pineview
 Rawls
 Ryes
 Seminole
 Shawtown
 Turlington
 Raven Rock
 Norrington
 Mount Pisgah

See also
 List of counties in North Carolina
 National Register of Historic Places listings in Harnett County, North Carolina
 North Carolina State Parks
 List of future Interstate Highways
 USS Harnett County (LST-821)
 Coharie Intra-tribal Council, Inc., state-recognized tribe that resides in the county

References

External links

 
 
 The Daily Record - newspaper headquartered in the county

 
Research Triangle
1855 establishments in North Carolina